A list of films produced by the Bollywood film industry based in Mumbai in 1979.

Top-grossing films 
The top ten grossing films at the Indian Box Office in
1979:

1979

Dubbed films

References

External links 
 Bollywood films of 1979 at the Internet Movie Database

1979
Bollywood
Films, Bollywood